There are multiple people named Prafulla Sen.
Prafulla Kumar Sen (died 1942), Indian revolutionary and philosopher
Prafulla Chandra Sen (1897–1990), Bengali freedom fighter and politician
P. K. Sen (surgeon) (1915–1982), Indian surgeon